Amenia station could refer to:

 Amenia station (New York), a former train station in Amenia, New York
 Amenia station (North Dakota), a historic train station in Amenia, North Dakota